Arivonimamo Air Base , or simply Antananarivo Arivonimamo Air Base, is a military airport located in Arivonimamo, Madagascar.

References

External links

List of airports in Madagascar

External links

Military airbases
Airports in Madagascar
Military installations of Madagascar